João Manuel Roque (born July 22, 1971) is a Portuguese-Angolan former featherweight Brazilian Jiu Jitsu (BJJ) black belt World Champion and a retired mixed martial artist. He competed in the Featherweight division in MMA (Mixed Martial Arts).

His first coaches of BJJ were Marcio Pinheiro and Gerson Velasco, and he stayed under their guidance until he was a purple belt. It was under prestigious Osvaldo Alves, a Brazilian Jiu Jitsu Red Belt and a legend in the sport of BJJ, that Joao Roque graduated to brown belt. When Master Oswaldo had to move to Manaus Roque joined André Pederneiras, right at the start of the Nova União.

Joao Roque began his MMA career in 1996 in the United States (Oklahoma) with a win by armbar. He retired in 2005 in the Japan (Tokyo) with a loss by decision.

Today he lives in Brasília, capital of Brazil. Roque went on to form one of the strongest teams in that state and his gym "Clube Vizinhança" still runs today.

BJJ lineage
Mitsuyo Maeda > Carlos Gracie > Carlson Gracie > André Pederneiras  > Joao Roque

Notable BJJ black belts graduated
 Bernado Pitel
 Jonatas Gurgel "Tagarela"
 Mark Andrew Bocek

Mixed martial arts record

|-
| Loss
| align=center| 7-2-4
| Alexandre Franca Nogueira
| Decision (unanimous)
| G-Shooto: Special 01
| 
| align=center| 3
| align=center| 5:00
| Tokyo Korakuen Hall
| 
|-
| Draw
| align=center| 7-1-4
| Hiroyuki Takaya
| Draw
| Shooto 2004: 1/24 in Korakuen Hall
| 
| align=center| 3
| align=center| 5:00
| Tokyo, Japan
| 
|-
| Win
| align=center| 7-1-3
| Hiroyuki Abe
| Submission (armbar)
| Shooto: Gig Central 4
| 
| align=center| 2
| align=center| 4:59
| Nagoya, Japan
| 
|-
| Win
| align=center| 6-1-3
| Naoya Uematsu
| Decision (unanimous)
| Shooto: 1/24 in Korakuen Hall
| 
| align=center| 3
| align=center| 5:00
| Tokyo, Japan
| 
|-
| Win
| align=center| 5-1-3
| Ryan Bow
| Decision (majority)
| Deep: 6th Impact
| 
| align=center| 3
| align=center| 5:00
| Tokyo, Japan
| 
|-
| Win
| align=center| 4-1-3
| Takehiro Murahama
| Submission (armbar)
| Deep: 4th Impact
| 
| align=center| 1
| align=center| 2:13
| Nagoya, Japan
| 
|-
| Win
| align=center| 3-1-3
| Stephen Palling
| Submission (armbar)
| World Fighting Alliance 1
| 
| align=center| 1
| align=center| 1:29
| Nevada, United States
| 
|-
| Win
| align=center| 2-1-3
| Takehiro Murahama
| Submission (armbar)
| Deep: 2nd Impact
| 
| align=center| 1
| align=center| 4:29
| Yokohama, Japan
| 
|-
| Loss
| align=center| 1-1-3
| Jens Pulver
| Decision
| UFC 26
| 
| align=center| 3
| align=center| 5:00
| Iowa, United States
| 
|-
| Draw
| align=center| 1-0-3
| Hisao Ikeda
| Draw
| VTJ 1999: Vale Tudo Japan 1999
| 
| align=center| 3
| align=center| 8:00
| Tokyo, Japan
| 
|-
| Draw
| align=center| 1-0-2
| Noboru Asahi
| Draw
| VTJ 1998: Vale Tudo Japan 1998
| 
| align=center| 3
| align=center| 8:00
| Tokyo, Japan
| 
|-
| Draw
| align=center| 1-0-1
| Uchu Tatsumi
| Draw
| VTJ 1997: Vale Tudo Japan 1997
| 
| align=center| 3
| align=center| 8:00
| Tokyo, Japan
| 
|-
| Win
| align=center| 1-0
| Abdelaziz Cherigui
| Submission (armbar)
| EF 3: Extreme Fighting 3
| 
| align=center| 1
| align=center| 4:02
| Oklahoma, United States
| 
|-

Submission grappling record
KO PUNCHES
|- style="text-align:center; background:#f0f0f0;"
| style="border-style:none none solid solid; "|Result
| style="border-style:none none solid solid; "|Opponent
| style="border-style:none none solid solid; "|Method
| style="border-style:none none solid solid; "|Event
| style="border-style:none none solid solid; "|Date
| style="border-style:none none solid solid; "|Round
| style="border-style:none none solid solid; "|Time
| style="border-style:none none solid solid; "|Notes
|-
|Win|| Dennis Hall || Decision || The Contenders|| 1997|| 5|| 5:00||
|-

References

External links
  
 

 Jiu-jitsu.net: Interview with João Roque
 BJJ Heroes: João Roque (Nova Uniao)

Living people
Angolan male mixed martial artists
Featherweight mixed martial artists
Lightweight mixed martial artists
Mixed martial artists utilizing Brazilian jiu-jitsu
Angolan practitioners of Brazilian jiu-jitsu
People awarded a black belt in Brazilian jiu-jitsu
Sportspeople from Luanda
1971 births
Ultimate Fighting Championship male fighters
World Brazilian Jiu-Jitsu Championship medalists